Lac d'Issarlès is a lake in Le Lac-d'Issarlès, Ardèche, France. At an elevation of 1000 m, its surface area is 0.9 km².

Landforms of Ardèche
Issarles